Gjorgji "Gjore" Jovanovski (born 22 March 1956) is a Macedonian football manager and former player.

Playing career
As a player, he played for FK Vardar and Red Star Belgrade in the Yugoslav First League and for Turkish club Samsunspor and Ankaragücü.

Coaching career
He had previously coached FK Vardar, FK Sloga Jugomagnat winning three championships and one cup title. After FK Rabotnichki Kometal winning two championship and qualified in the third round qualification for UEFA Champion League (eliminated by Lille/France)before moving to FK Milano Kumanovo and FK Metalurg Skopje. He was also a Head coach of Macedonian national team from 2001 till 2002. He was chosen three times for the award of the "best football coach in Macedonia" by Sport radio 90.3 fm having been one of the best coaches in Macedonia winning five league and two cup titles. He was also the head coach of the Macedonian national team from 2001 to 2002.

On 17 August 2010, Jovanovski was announced as the manager of CSKA Sofia. He qualified with CSKA Sofia in UEFA Europa League group stages

On 21 October 2010, Jovanovski was removed from his position of head coach of CSKA Sofia, after a 0:2 home loss against Rapid Vienna in a UEFA Europa League

On 8 November 2011, Jovanovski was named as manager of FK Rabotnichki but after only two months as the manager, the club board and he agreed to mutually terminate his contract on 28 December 2011.

Managerial statistics

Honours
FK Sloga Jugomagnat
Macedonian Football Cup: 1
Winner: 2003–04
FK Rabotnichki Skopje
Macedonian First League: 2
Winner: 2004–05, 2005–06
Runner-up: 2006–07

Notes

References

External links
 Playing career at PlayerHistory.com
 

1956 births
Living people
Footballers from Skopje
Association football midfielders
Macedonian footballers
Yugoslav footballers
FK Vardar players
Red Star Belgrade footballers
Samsunspor footballers
MKE Ankaragücü footballers
Yugoslav First League players
Süper Lig players
Yugoslav expatriate footballers
Macedonian expatriate footballers
Expatriate footballers in Turkey
Macedonian expatriate sportspeople in Turkey
Yugoslav expatriate sportspeople in Turkey
Macedonian football managers
FK Vardar managers
FK Sloga Jugomagnat managers
North Macedonia national football team managers
Samsunspor managers
FK Rabotnički managers
FK Milano Kumanovo managers
FK Metalurg Skopje managers
PFC CSKA Sofia managers
FK Shkëndija managers
FK Bregalnica Štip managers
Macedonian expatriate football managers
Expatriate football managers in Turkey
Expatriate football managers in Bulgaria
Macedonian expatriate sportspeople in Bulgaria